Watoosh! is the only studio album released by Canadian rock band Pezz, released in 1999 before they changed their name to Billy Talent. The album was re-released in 2005 through Atlantic Records.

Track listing 

 Track 13 is an instrumental, while tracks 11, 12 and 14–16 are blank.
 The track "M & M" is about a group of gothic kids that used to come into the HMV where Benjamin Kowalewicz worked.

Personnel 
Benjamin Kowalewicz – lead vocals
Ian D'Sa – lead guitar, backing vocals, cover art
Jonathan Gallant – bass, backing vocals
Aaron Solowoniuk – drums
Brad Nelson – producer
Daryl Smith – engineer/mixing
Brett Zilahi – mastering

See also 
Dudebox

References 

Billy Talent albums
1999 albums